Scott Clayton Greene (born June 1, 1972) is a former professional American football player who played running back for four seasons for the Carolina Panthers and Indianapolis Colts. Greene attended Canandaigua Academy and holds many football records there. He was the Section V player of the year while at Canadaigua Academy in 1991. Greene was inducted into the Canandaigua Academy Athletic Hall of Fame in 2001.

Greene served head football coach at the University of Rochester from 2006 to 2017, compiling a record of 50–64.

References

External links
 Rochester profile

1972 births
Living people
American football running backs
Carolina Panthers players
Indianapolis Colts players
Michigan State Spartans football players
Rochester Yellowjackets football coaches
People from Honeoye, New York
Coaches of American football from New York (state)
Players of American football from New York (state)